The Chris Moyles Show was a BBC Radio 1 breakfast show in the United Kingdom, presented by Chris Moyles. It aired between 5 January 2004 and 14 September 2012.

2011
There were 46 guests on the show during 2011.

2010
There were 72 guests on the show during 2010.

2009
There were 70 guests on the show during 2009.

Other notable guests
In the summer of 2004, Moyles interviewed the then British Prime Minister, Tony Blair as part of Sport Relief. Among questions posed to the PM was to name his favourite type of cheese, to which Blair replied Cheddar.

References

BBC Radio 1
BBC-related lists